Yadvinder Singh Malhi  (Punjabi: ਯਦਵਿੰਦਰ ਸਿੰਘ ਮਲਹੀ, born 1968) is professor of Ecosystem Science at the University of Oxford and a Jackson Senior Research Fellow at Oriel College, Oxford.

Education
Malhi was educated at Southend High School for Boys and Queens' College, Cambridge where he graduated with a Master of Arts degree in natural sciences (specialising in physics) in 1990. He completed postgraduate study at the University of Reading where he was awarded a PhD in meteorology in 1993 for research on the earth's energy budget and heat fluxes supervised by Alan Ibbetson and George Dugdale.

Research and career
Malhi has advanced our understanding of the functioning of terrestrial ecosystems and how they are responding to the pressures of global change in the Anthropocene, including climate change, biodiversity decline and loss of megafauna. This work integrates insights from ecosystem ecology into earth system science, and has been characterised by an interdisciplinary approach that involves establishing broad networks of field research in tropical forests in some of the most remote and challenging regions of the world. His early career focused on Amazonia, but in recent years his research interests have expanded across Africa and Asia. He has ongoing projects in Malaysia, the Ankasa Conservation Area, Kakum National Park and Kogyae Strict Nature Reserve in Ghana, Lopé National Park in Gabon, the Serra do Mar coastal forests in Brazil. In the context of the UK he has particular interests in ecosystems restoration, and also conducts extensive ecological research at Wytham Woods the Amazon rainforest and the Andes. He co-founded the RAINFOR network of forest plots across the Amazon forest (with Oliver Phillips), helped establish a 3500 m elevation transect study in the Amazon-Andes of Peru, and more recently founded the Global Ecosystems Monitoring (GEM) network of intensively studied sites across the tropics.  His work also makes use of microscale meteorology, global climate datasets, terrestrial ecosystem models and satellite remote sensing. This work has contributed to our understanding of the carbon sink in the terrestrial biosphere, and to how it may be vulnerable to climate warming. Malhi's research interests extend to a broad understanding of contemporary change in the biosphere and how to navigate it through the Anthropocene, through a combination of natural sciences, social sciences and science policy.

With Oliver Phillips at the University of Leeds, he co-edited the book Tropical Forests and Global Atmospheric Change published in 2005 by Oxford University Press. He was one of the 620 global contributors to the IPCC Fourth Assessment Report published by the Intergovernmental Panel on Climate Change in 2007.

As part of his teaching activities, he leads field trips to Wytham Woods in Oxfordshire. Malhi's research has been funded by the Natural Environment Research Council (NERC), the Royal Society, the European Union, the European Research Council (ERC), the Gordon and Betty Moore Foundation, Microsoft Research and the Earthwatch Institute. Before moving in Oxford in 2004, Malhi was a postdoctoral researcher(1995–1999) and Royal Society University Research Fellow (1999-2004) at the University of Edinburgh.

He was President of the Association for Tropical Biology and Conservation (ATBC) over 2017-2019, and is President-Elect of the British Ecological Society.

Awards and honours
Malhi was elected a Fellow of the Royal Society (FRS) in 2017 having previously been awarded a Royal Society University Research Fellowship (URF) from 1999 to 2005.
In 2016 he was awarded the Marsh Award for Climate Change of the British Ecological Society, and in 2018 he was awarded the Patron's Medal of the Royal Geographical Society.

Malhi was appointed Commander of the Order of the British Empire (CBE) in the 2020 Birthday Honours for services to ecosystem science.

References

Fellows of the Royal Society
People educated at Southend High School for Boys
Fellows of Oriel College, Oxford
Alumni of Queens' College, Cambridge
Royal Society University Research Fellows
British ecologists
Living people
1968 births
Recipients of the Royal Geographical Society Patron's Medal
Commanders of the Order of the British Empire